The Columbia County Jail is a historic structure at Calhoun and Jefferson Streets in Magnolia, Arkansas. The brick two story structurewas designed by Thompson & Harding and was built c. 1920, and is an excellent local example of Italian Renaissance architecture.  It is faced in cream-colored brick, and has a terracotta hipped roof.  It has an entrance portico with round arches supported by slender columns and gargoyles at its corners.

The building was listed on the U.S. National Register of Historic Places in 1982 for its architecture; it was still used as a jail at that time.

See also
National Register of Historic Places listings in Columbia County, Arkansas

References

Jails on the National Register of Historic Places in Arkansas
Government buildings completed in 1920
National Register of Historic Places in Columbia County, Arkansas
Italian Renaissance Revival architecture in the United States
1920 establishments in Arkansas
Magnolia, Arkansas